The vice-chancellor of Germany, unofficially the vice-chancellor of the Federal Republic of Germany, officially the deputy to the federal chancellor, is the second highest ranking German cabinet member. The chancellor is the head of government and, according to the constitution, gives this title of deputy to one of the federal ministers. It is common that the title is given to the major minister provided by the (smaller) coalition partner.

In everyday politics, being a vice chancellor is more an honorary title. The vice-chancellor may head cabinet meetings when the chancellor is abroad. The function of vice chancellor is to use the specific constitutional powers of the chancellor in case that the chancellor is unable to perform their duties. This kind of substitution has never been made use of in the history of the Federal Republic.

Should a chancellor resign, die or be permanently unable to perform the duties of office, the vice chancellor does not automatically become the next chancellor. In such a case the Federal President assigns a minister to serve as acting chancellor until the Bundestag (parliament) elects a new chancellor.).

Although  is the constitutional term, most Germans know the deputy by the expression Vice-Chancellor. Chancellor is the traditional term for the German head of government since 1867/71. A general deputy was introduced by law in 1878. The current office or title has existed since the constitution of 1949.

The current vice-chancellor of Germany is Robert Habeck, who took office on 8 December 2021, succeeding Olaf Scholz, who gave up the role in order to become chancellor.

History

In addition to the general deputy, who could sign for all the affairs of the chancellor, the chancellor could appoint deputies with limited responsibilities. The act was revised on 28 October 1918, when the possibility of appointing deputies with limited responsibilities was removed and the vice-chancellor was given the right to appear before parliament.

In the Weimar Republic, the office was considered less important. It was not even mentioned in the constitution. Usually it was held by the minister of justice or the interior. The most known office holder is Franz von Papen, a former chancellor who formed a coalition government of national socialists and conservatives. Adolf Hitler became Chancellor, and Papen Vice-Chancellor. It became soon obvious that the position of Vice-Chancellor provided no powers and was unsuited to constrain Hitler. Papen was convinced that him being trusted by president Hindenburg made him an important political player; soon, Hindenburg's trust went from Papen to Hitler.

In the Federal Republic (since 1949), the Chancellors have had no interest in allowing the Deputy to use the title for self promotion. Since 1966 it became customary that the coalition partner of the governing party received the ministry of the exterior who was also appointed Deputy. The ministry of the exterior was considered to be the most important cabinet post besides the Chancellorship. This tradition faded away in the time of Merkel's office, partially, because political heavyweights of the coalition partner chose a different ministry for personal preference.

Office and appointment mechanism 
The German cabinet consists of the Chancellor and the Federal Ministers. According to the Basic Law (Article 69.1), the Chancellor appoints one of the  ministers as Vice-Chancellor. In contrast to the appointment of a cabinet minister, there is no need for a formal appointment by the President. The appointment is an exclusive power of the Chancellor.

The Chancellor is theoretically free to choose a deputy chancellor. In practice, a German government is usually based on a coalition of two or more parties and the Chancellor gives the title to a minister of the second largest coalition party upon recommendation of that party's leadership.

The German Vice-Chancellor can be regarded as the equivalent of a deputy prime minister in other parliamentary systems. Unlike the Vice President post in presidential systems of governments, the German Vice-Chancellor is not the automatic successor in the event that a sitting Chancellor suddenly leaves office.

A German cabinet exists only as long as the current Chancellor is in office. The end of a Chancellor's term in office (either by death or resignation or the first meeting of a newly elected Bundestag) automatically terminates the office of any minister. If this happens, the President of Germany appoints the former Chancellor or, if this is not possible, one of the former cabinet ministers (not necessarily, but most likely the former Vice-Chancellor) as Acting Chancellor, until the parliament elects a new Chancellor. When in 1974 Chancellor Willy Brandt resigned and refused to remain in office until his successor's election, President Gustav Heinemann ensured a corresponding precedent and appointed former Vice-Chancellor Walter Scheel as Acting Chancellor.

The Basic Law does not state who shall perform the Chancellor's powers and duties, if both the Chancellor and the Vice-Chancellor are unable to do so. The German cabinet's rules of procedure state that in absence of both office-holders cabinet meetings shall be chaired by a cabinet member designated for this purpose by either the Chancellor or the Vice-Chancellor or, if such a designation has not taken place or if the designee is not able to do so, by the present cabinet member with the longest uninterrupted membership in the federal government (§22.1). It is however unclear, whether this provision extends to other powers of the office of Chancellor. In an expertise issued by the Bundestag's scientific service in 2014, the legal opinion is that this is the case.

List of vice-chancellors

German Reich (1871–1945)

German Empire (1871–1918) 
Political party:

Weimar Republic (1918–1933)
Political party:

Nazi Germany (1933–1945)

Federal Republic of Germany (1949–present) 
Political party:

References 

 
Federal Government of Germany